Ilenia Lazzarin (born 6 September 1982 in Busto Arsizio, Province of Varese, Lombardy) is an Italian screen actress.

Her most prominent role is the character Viola Bruni in the Neapolitan television soap opera Un Posto al Sole (also known as A Place in the Sun).

Television and video work
Atlantis (television film; 2000) as Samantha
Le Ali della Vita 2 (television film; 2001)
Un Posto al Sole (television series; since 2001) as Viola Bruni
When in Rome (direct-to-video film; 2002) as Dari

References

External links

 
 Official website

1982 births
Living people
People from Busto Arsizio
Italian television actresses